Ioseb is a Georgian given name and may refer to:

Ioseb Abakelia (1882–1938), pioneering Georgian physician and medical scholar, specializing in phthisiatry
Catholicos Ioseb of Abkhazia (1739–1776), Georgian Orthodox hierarch, Metropolitan Bishop of Gelati and Catholicos of Abkhazia
Ioseb Bardanashvili (born 1948 in Georgia), Israeli and Georgian composer
Ioseb Chakhvashvili (born 1993), Georgian Football Midfielder
Ioseb Chugoshvili (born 1986), amateur Belarusian Greco-Roman wrestler of Georgian origin,
Ioseb Dzhugashvili (aka Joseph Stalin) (1878–1953), Georgian revolutionary and Soviet political leader
Ioseb Grishashvili, pen name of Ioseb Mamulishvili (1889–1965), poet and historian from Georgia
Ioseb Iremashvili (1878–1944), Georgian politician and author
Ioseb Kechakmadze (1939–2013), Georgian composer

See also
Joseph

Georgian masculine given names